Hystricella bicarinata is a species of air-breathing land snail, a terrestrial pulmonate gastropod mollusk in the family Geomitridae, the hairy snails and their allies. 

Two subspecies are recognised, one extant and one known only as a fossil.

This species is endemic to the island of Porto Santo in the Madeira archipelago, Portugal. They are terrestrial and are found under rocks in grasslands. They have a very limited range, confined to about ten square kilometers but are abundant within that area.

References

 Bank, R. A.; Neubert, E. (2017). Checklist of the land and freshwater Gastropoda of Europe. Last update: July 16th, 2017

External links
 G. B. I. (1824). Descriptions, accompanied by figures, of several Helices, discovered by T. E. Bowdich, Esq. at Porto Santo. Zoological Journal. 1: 56-58
  Lowe, R. T. (1831). Primitiae faunae et florae Maderae et Portus Sancti; sive species quaedam novae vel hactenus minus rite cognitae animalium et plantarum in his insulis degentium breviter descriptae. Transactions of the Cambridge Philosophical Society. 4 (1): 1-70, pl. 1-6. Cambridge
 De Mattia, W., Neiber, M. T. & Groh, K. (2018). Revision of the genus-group Hystricella R. T. Lowe, 1855 from Porto Santo (Madeira Archipelago), with descriptions of new recent and fossil taxa (Gastropoda, Helicoidea, Geomitridae). ZooKeys. 732: 1-125

Endemic fauna of Madeira
Molluscs of Europe
Geomitridae
Gastropods described in 1824
Taxa named by George Brettingham Sowerby I